Princess Nakatindi may refer to:
Nakatindi Yeta Nganga (1922–1972), Zambian politician
Nakatindi Wina (1945–2012), Zambian politician